The canton of Chambord is an administrative division of the Loir-et-Cher department, central France. It was created at the French canton reorganisation which came into effect in March 2015. Its seat is in Chambord.

It consists of the following communes:
 
Bauzy
Bracieux
Chambord
Courmemin
Crouy-sur-Cosson
Dhuizon
La Ferté-Beauharnais
La Ferté-Saint-Cyr
Fontaines-en-Sologne
Huisseau-sur-Cosson
La Marolle-en-Sologne
Maslives
Montlivault
Mont-près-Chambord
Montrieux-en-Sologne
Neung-sur-Beuvron
Neuvy
Saint-Claude-de-Diray
Saint-Dyé-sur-Loire
Saint-Laurent-Nouan
Thoury
Tour-en-Sologne
Villeny

References

Cantons of Loir-et-Cher